Markowo may refer to the following places:
Markowo, Inowrocław County in Kuyavian-Pomeranian Voivodeship (north-central Poland)
Markowo, Włocławek County in Kuyavian-Pomeranian Voivodeship (north-central Poland)
Markowo, Podlaskie Voivodeship (north-east Poland)
Markowo, Greater Poland Voivodeship (west-central Poland)
Markowo, Gołdap County in Warmian-Masurian Voivodeship (north Poland)
Markowo, Ostróda County in Warmian-Masurian Voivodeship (north Poland)